Cheryle Chagnon-Greyeyes is a Canadian politician who served the leader of the Green Party of Alberta from September 2018 until her resignation in September 2019. She has worked at the University of Calgary and is Cree from Muskeg Lake Cree Nation. Chagnon-Greyeyes was the first Indigenous woman to lead a Canadian provincial party.

Electoral record

References

External links

Date of birth missing (living people)
Living people
Politicians from Calgary
21st-century Canadian politicians
Leaders of the Green Party of Alberta (2011–present)
Year of birth missing (living people)
First Nations women in politics
Female Canadian political party leaders
21st-century Canadian women politicians